Brackett is a small lunar impact crater that lies near the southeast edge of Mare Serenitatis. The crater is named after American physicist Frederick Sumner Brackett. The crater has been covered by lava flow, leaving only a ring-shaped trace in the surrounding lunar mare. This crater is best observed under oblique illumination, as it is otherwise difficult to find. The southern rim is almost contacting a rille system named the Rimae Plinius.

References

External links

Brackett at The Moon Wiki
 LTO-42C4 Brackett — L&PI topographic map

Impact craters on the Moon